Roberto Alejandro Salcedo Reynoso (born December 19, 1991, in Chapala, Jalisco) is a former Mexican professional footballer, who last played for Atletico San Luis of Mexico.

Career

References

External links

Liga MX players
Living people
1991 births
Footballers from Jalisco
Mexican footballers
Association football goalkeepers
Club Necaxa footballers
Atlético San Luis footballers